The 1922 Paris–Roubaix was the 23rd edition of the Paris–Roubaix, a classic one-day cycle race in France. The single day event was held on 16 April 1922 and stretched  from Paris to its end in a velodrome in Roubaix. The winner was Albert Dejonghe from Belgium.

Results

References

Paris–Roubaix
Paris–Roubaix
Paris–Roubaix
Paris–Roubaix